"Right Here Next to You" is the debut single by Danish singer Jon Nørgaard, from his debut album This Side Up. It came out on CD in 2002 and as a digital download on 15 September 2003. The song peaked at number 1 on the Danish Singles Chart.

Track listing
Digital download
 "Right Here Next to You" - 3:41
 "Right Here Next to You" (Jon & Jules Remix) - 3:42

Chart performance

Release history

References

Jon Nørgaard songs
2002 debut singles
2002 songs
Song articles with missing songwriters